Cathedral is an album by Castanets, released on October 19, 2004 through Asthmatic Kitty. Part of the album was recorded live and includes a dozen local musicians. Led by Raymond Raposa, this is the band's first foray into studio recording, which he described as 'a really protracted, uncomfortable process'. The release features guest-vocals by Brigit DeCook and Liz Janes. The material was partly recorded in a remote cabin in Northern California. Raposa had planned to publish a novel to accompany the album, which failed to surface.

Critical acclaim 
Amanda Petrusich of Pitchfork.com compared Raposa's writing on Cathedral to that of the poet Seamus Heaney. She described the album as a collection of 'deep gothic ballads' of 'country music [that] should sound like death, and more specifically, death-by-murky-submersion'. Heather Phares of allmusic.com referred to the religious overtones of the album, describing it as 'spiritual searching' and as having 'a certain dark theatricality'. Justin Cober-Lake at popmatters.com described Cathedral as having 'lo-fi production [which] helps develop the darkness of Castanets’ music. [It] sounds as if it was recorded in the desert at night, which suits the pre-technology fears of the album'. Jon Pit from Dusted Magazine called it 'another welcome installment in the folk renaissance' although he described Raposa's vocals as 'lacklustre'. In December 2004, American webzine Somewhere Cold ranked Cathedral No. 8 on their 2004 Somewhere Cold Awards Hall of Fame list.

Track listing

Personnel 
The album lists individuals as performers and cryptic descriptions of their parts, these include:
 Mia Ferm 
 Nathan Hubbard
 Nicholas Delffs
 Nathan Delffs
 Nicholas Hennies
 Connor Kirkwood 
 Daniel Bryant 
 Pall Jenkins
 Christopher Cory 
 Gabriel Sundy
 Josh Quon
 Sean Jerd
 Raymond Raposa
 Brigit DeCook 
 Elizabeth Janes
 Rafter Roberts

References

2004 albums
Castanets (band) albums
Asthmatic Kitty albums
Psychedelic folk albums